Somerville is a historic home located near Kenton, Kent County, Delaware.  It is a two-story, five bay, brick structure with a Victorian cross-gable roof and portico. The rear wing was the original dwelling, built about 1798.  This section was expanded about 1806.  Also on the property is a contributing brick barn.  It was the home of Delaware statesman Nicholas Ridgely.

It was listed on the National Register of Historic Places in 1974.

References

Houses on the National Register of Historic Places in Delaware
Houses completed in 1798
Houses in Kent County, Delaware
Kenton, Delaware
National Register of Historic Places in Kent County, Delaware